The 2017 FIFA Beach Soccer World Cup was the ninth edition of the FIFA Beach Soccer World Cup, the premier international beach soccer championship contested by the men's national teams of the member associations of FIFA. Overall, this was the 19th edition of a world cup in beach soccer since the establishment of the Beach Soccer World Championships which ran from 1995 to 2004 but was not governed by FIFA. This was the fourth tournament to take place under the biennial basis; the World Cup now takes place once every two years, after taking place on a yearly basis until 2009.

FIFA originally started the bidding process in April 2013, whilst in December 2014, the Bahamas were appointed as hosts; this was the first time a men's senior FIFA tournament was hosted in the Caribbean, and the first FIFA tournament hosted by the Bahamas. Fifteen teams advanced through their respective preliminary continental qualification competitions, which started in September 2016 and ended in March 2017, to join the host team in the final tournament which included three nations making their debuts at the finals and notably saw two-time champions (in 2011 and 2013) Russia fail to qualify. The tournament was played from 27 April to 7 May 2017, with all 32 matches hosted in one 3,500 seater stadium, in the Bahamian capital, Nassau.

The hosts, making their first appearance at a World Cup, exited at the group stage. Portugal were the defending champions, but were eliminated by Brazil in the quarter-finals. Brazil ultimately went on to defeat Tahiti in the final to claim their fourteenth world title since the competition's inception in 1995, and their fifth title of the FIFA era, ending an eight-year wait after last winning the crown in 2009. Iran finished third to claim the best ever placing by an Asian nation in the history of the competition.

Host selection

First bidding
On 17 April 2013, FIFA announced that bidding had begun for five competitions between 2016 and 2017, including the FIFA Beach Soccer World Cup. Declarations of interest were made by May 15 deadline whilst the hosts were scheduled to be revealed in December 2013.

The following 10 countries made an official bid for the World Cup, as revealed by FIFA on 28 May 2013. 

 Argentina
 Bahrain
 Equatorial Guinea
 Estonia
 India
 Israel
 Mexico
 Seychelles
 South Africa
 Turkey

Second bidding
Due to undisclosed circumstances, FIFA did not pick a host from the first round of bidding by December 2013. And so on 6 March 2014, FIFA announced that bidding had re-opened for the 2017 FIFA Beach Soccer World Cup. New member associations interested in hosting submitted a declaration of interest by 15 April 2014, and provided the complete set of bidding documents by 1 October 2014.

The following 12 countries made official bids for hosting the tournament. Argentina were the only country to submit an entry in both rounds of bidding.

 Argentina
 Bahamas
 Brazil
 Cayman Islands
 Costa Rica
 Ecuador
 Egypt
 El Salvador
 Germany
 Trinidad & Tobago
 United Arab Emirates
 United States

On 19 December 2014, the FIFA Executive Committee announced the Bahamas as hosts.

Qualification
Qualification began with the European qualifiers on 2 September 2016 and concluded with the final match of the AFC event on 11 March 2017. The hosts, the Bahamas, qualified automatically.

European nations usually receive five spots at the World Cup, and North American nations, two. However Since the Bahamas, as hosts, automatically qualified, taking one of the two North American two berths by default, it was decided by FIFA to transfer one spot from UEFA to CONCACAF to still allow two North American countries to qualify as normal, reducing the number of European berths to four.

African zone

The two African qualifiers were determined via the 2016 Africa Beach Soccer Cup of Nations (the first time the qualification event was held under the Africa Cup of Nations title after CAF upped their commitment to beach soccer in 2015). Eight nations took part in the finals between 13 and 18 December in Lagos, Nigeria, who qualified from a preliminary 14 team, two-legged play off event in August and September. Senegal ultimately proved victorious claiming their fourth African crown and fourth successive qualification to the World Cup. Runners-up and hosts Nigeria also qualified, their first qualification since 2011.

Asian zone

The qualifiers for members of the AFC took place in Kuala Terengganu, Malaysia between 4 and 11 March 2017. 14 teams originally entered but two (Myanmar and Uzbekistan) withdrew before the start of the tournament. Having never failed to qualify for a FIFA era World Cup, Japan narrowly progressed to the semi finals of the competition as the best runner-up of the three groups in the group stage. Iran and the United Arab Emirates successfully won their semi finals to qualify for the World Cup (for the 7th and 5th time respectively), with Iran winning the final (their 2nd AFC title). Semi final losers Japan and Lebanon contested the final World Cup berth in the third place play off with the Japanese coming out on top to qualify.

European zone

The qualifiers for the members of UEFA took place between 2 and 11 September 2016 in Jesolo, Italy. A total of 28 teams entered into the tournament with the top four teams (the semi finalists) qualifying for the World Cup finals. In a surprise result, Poland, ranked 12th in Europe prior to the competition, won the event and secured only their second qualification to a World Cup finals following their debut in 2006. The other successful qualifiers were runners-up Switzerland, third placed and defending World Champions Portugal who beat Italy, finishing fourth, the final qualifier. Poland's success in the second group stage caused a major upset by denying two time World Cup champions (2011 and 2013) Russia a berth at the finals for the first time since 2006. Three time World Cup runners-up (2003, 2004 and 2013) Spain also failed to qualify for just the second time since their debut in 1998.

North, Central American and Caribbean Zone

The North American qualification event took place between 20 and 26 February 2017 in Nassau, the Bahamas at the very stadium the World Cup would be hosted in. 16 teams took part contesting two qualification berths. In a surprise to all, Panama, in just their second CONCACAF Beach Soccer Championship appearance, beat all four historically dominant forces in North America on their way to winning the tournament (Costa Rica in the group stage, the United States in the quarter finals, El Salvador in the semi finals and defending champions Mexico in the final). As the finalists, Panama and Mexico qualified for the World Cup, the former for the first time (the first new North American World Cup debutants since 2009), the latter for the fifth time.

Oceanian zone
The 2017 OFC Beach Soccer Championship was originally scheduled to take place in February, however for undisclosed reasons, the tournament was cancelled. Due to their strong performances at the previous two World Cups, the OFC handpicked Tahiti to be the Oceanian representative at the 2017 World Cup (without having to qualify) in December 2015.

South American zone

Qualifiers for South America took place in Lambaré, Paraguay between 5 and 12 February 2017 with all 10 members of CONMEBOL taking part (the only qualification event to see all members of the respective confederation participate). With three berths available, finalists Brazil and hosts Paraguay secured their qualification by winning their respective semi finals. Brazil beat the Paraguayans in the final to win their sixth title. Ecuador beat Argentina on penalties in the third place play off to claim the final spot at the World Cup, their first qualification after missing out by one placing, finishing fourth, on three previous occasions. This condemned Argentina to their first absence from a World Cup since 2003, their first of the FIFA era, and missing just a third World Cup in total having first appeared in the maiden event in 1995.

Qualified teams
The following 16 teams qualified for the final tournament. In addition to Bahamas who qualified automatically as hosts, the other 15 teams qualified from six separate continental competitions. The slot allocation was approved by the FIFA Executive Committee on 17 March 2016.

1.Teams that will make their debut.

Organisation

The following were key milestones in the organisation of the tournament:
The official emblem was unveiled on 28 July 2016.
The match schedule was announced on 30 August 2016.
The official match ball was revealed on 27 January 2017.
The official song of the World Cup, Pure Good Vibes by Bahamian artist Rock Carey, was revealed alongside the draw on 28 February 2017.
The FIFA Beach Soccer World Cup Bahamas 2017 Trophy Experience, touring the winners' trophy around five islands of the Bahamas between March and April 2017, was launched on 21 March 2017.
To mark the 30-day countdown to the start of the tournament, the official promotional poster of the World Cup was unveiled by FIFA on 29 March 2017 at the National Beach Soccer Arena at Malcolm Park.
 FIFA's partners (Adidas, Coca-Cola, Gazprom, Kia Motors, Visa and WANDA) were the tournament's main sponsors along with national supporters in the Bahamas (BTC, Kalik Light and Scotiabank)
A budget of US$7 million was approved for the tournament. In 2019, the final cost was reported over-budget at a total of US$9.93 million.

Venue
One venue in the capital city of Nassau was used.

Match officials
FIFA chose 24 officials from 24 different countries to referee matches at the World Cup, who were revealed on 31 March 2017. At least one referee was representing each of the six confederations: four from the AFC, three from CAF, five from CONMEBOL, three from CONCACAF, one from the OFC and eight from UEFA.

Draw
The official draw was held on 28 February 2017, 20:00 EST (UTC−5), at the Atlantis Paradise Island Hotel in Nassau, Bahamas, in the attendance of the Bahamas Prime Minister, Perry Christie and CONCACAF General Secretary, Philippe Moggio. Former Brazilian association football international, Emerson and Miss Universe Bahamas 2016, Cherell Williamson, assisted the draw.

The 16 teams were drawn into four groups of four teams, with hosts Bahamas being allocated to position A1. The teams were seeded into their respective pots based on their BSWW Beach Soccer Rankings published on 27 February 2017, with the highest ranked teams placed into pot 1 alongside the hosts, the next highest ranked into pot 2 and so on. The identity of the AFC teams were not known at the time of the draw, so the three slots reserved for AFC teams were seeded based on the order in which they would finish in the 2017 AFC Beach Soccer Championship and not the world rankings, with the winners of the qualifiers going to pot 2, runners-up to pot 3 and third place team to pot 4. Teams from the same confederation could not be drawn against each other for the group stage.

Squads

Each team first named a preliminary squad of 18 players. From the preliminary squad, the team then named a final squad of 12 players (two of whom had to be goalkeepers) by the FIFA deadline of 20 April 2017. Players in the final squad may be replaced due to serious injury up to 24 hours prior to kickoff of the team's first match.

Group stage
Each team earns three points for a win in regulation time, two points for a win in extra time, one point for a win in a penalty shoot-out, and no points for a defeat. The top two teams of each group advance to the quarter-finals.

All times are local, EDT (UTC−4).

Tiebreakers
The rankings of teams in each group are determined as follows (regulations Article 18.5):

If two or more teams are equal on the basis of the above criterion, their rankings are determined as follows:

Group A

Group B

Group C

Group D

Knockout stage

Bracket

Quarter-finals

Semi-finals

Third place match

Final

Awards
In the aftermath of the final at 18:00 local time, FIFA presented individual awards to the three best players of the tournament, three top goal scorers, and to the best goalkeeper. In addition, a collective award was given to the team with the most points in the Fair Play ranking. Following this, this winners trophy was awarded to Brazil, the champions of this year's World Cup.

When deciding the scoring awards, players tied with the same number of goals scored were then split based on the number of assists the tied players in question provided during the tournament, with the player with more assists ranked higher than the other. In this case, Rodrigo and Ahmadzadeh were tied on nine goals each. However Rodrigo had three assists to Ahmadzadeh's one and so were ranked accordingly.

Winners

Individual awards

Statistics

Goalscorers
Top goalscorer, Gabriele Gori, recorded the second highest number of goals ever scored in a World Cup with 17 and became the first Italian of the FIFA era to be top scorer (Alessandro Altobelli was top scorer in the pre-FIFA era in 1995 and 1996). Notably Madjer (who holds the record for the highest number of goals scored at a single World Cup (21 in 2006) and the highest tally of goals overall in the FIFA era at 87) failed to score even a single goal at a World Cup finals for the very first time.

Former Golden Boot winner, Dejan Stankovic, scored his highest number of goals (seven) since winning the award with 16 in 2009. The winner of the Golden Boot in the last edition, Pedro Moran (who won the award with eight goals) scored five goals this time around.

There was a total of 103 scorers in this year's World Cup.

17 goals
 Gabriele Gori

9 goals

 Mohammad Ahmadzadeh
 Rodrigo

8 goals

 Mauricinho
 Catarino

7 goals
 Dejan Stankovic

6 goals

 Ibrahima Balde
 Takasuke Goto

5 goals

 Papa Ndoye
 Dario Ramacciotti
 Noel Ott
 Paolo Palmacci
 Pedro Moran
 Abu Azeez
 Glenn Hodel
 Patrick Tepa
 Mohammad Mokhtari
 Mamour Diagne

4 goals

 Boguslaw Saganowski
 Heiarii Tavanae
 Jordan Santos
 Jakub Jesionowski
 Carlos Carballo

3 goals

 Ramon Maldonado
 Naea Bennett
 Godspower Igudia
 Victor Tale
 Takuya Akaguma
 Hamidou Barry
 Raimana Li Fung Kuee
 Datinha

2 goals

 Gavin Christie
 Haitham Mohamed
 Emeka Ogbonna
 Walid Mohammad
 Ze Maria
 Orlando Zayas
 Matteo Marrucci
 Daniel
 Lucao
 Francesco Corosiniti
 Bruno Torres
 Belchior
 Daniel Cedeno
 Hamad Diouf
 Takaaki Oba
 Benjamin Mosco
 Lansana Diassy
 Nicola Werder
 Jean Francois
 Michele Di Palma
 Ali Nazem
 Leo Martins
 Lesly St. Fleur
 Moslem Mesigar
 Shusei Yamauchi
 Tearii Labaste
 Emmanuele Zurlo
 Amir Akbari

1 goal

 Abdiel Villa
 Bruno Xavier
 Mo Jaeggy
 Fernando
 Joffre Delgado
 Konrad Kubiak
 Pascual Galvez
 Kyle Williams
 Witold Ziober
 Cristhian Gallegos
 Segundo Moreira
 Jorge Bailon
 Julio Watson
 Filipe
 Angelo Tchen
 Heimanu Taiarui
 Justo Arrocha
 Coimbra
 Emmanuel Ohwoferia
 Gilberto Rangel
 Mão
 Jonathan Torohia
 Babacar Fall
 Juan Lopez
 Bokinha
 Jesus Rolon
 Sandro Spaccarotella
 Tomasz Lenart
 Ali Karim
 Ivan Fernandez
 Waleed Beshr
 Alan Cavalcanti
 Sergio Villaverde
 Alessio Frainetti
 Gustavo Benitez
 Bruno Novo
 Papa Ndour
 Peyman Hosseini
 Bartholomew Ibenegbu
 Mamadou Sylla
 Alfioluca Chiavaro
 Tomoyuki Iino
 Angel Rodriguez

Own goals

 Raimoana Bennett (vs. Poland)
 Takasuke Goto (vs. Brazil)
 Bokhinha (vs. Japan)

Source: FIFA

Discipline
Summary of statistics

Total number of yellow cards: 58Average yellow cards per match: 1.81
Total number of red cards: 3Average red cards per match: 0.09
First yellow card of the tournament:Angel Rodriguez for Mexico against Iran
First red card of the tournament:Al Seyni Ndiaye for Senegal against Switzerland
Most cards issued (match): 7 (7 yellow, 0 red)Tahiti v Poland
Fewest cards issued (match): 0Brazil v Tahiti, Portugal v Panama, Panama v United Arab Emirates, Paraguay v Portugal, Nigeria v Iran, Paraguay v Panama, Switzerland v Iran, Tahiti v Brazil
Most yellow cards (team): 10
Most red cards (team): 1, 

Fewest yellow cards (team): 0, 
Most fouls committed (team, per game): 10
Most fouls suffered (team, per game): 9
Fewest fouls committed (team, per game): 4
Fewest fouls suffered (team, per game): 2
Most fouls committed causing a penalty (team, total): 5
Fewest fouls committed causing a penalty (team, total): 0,,  

Most yellow cards received  (2)
 Gary Joseph
 Witold Ziober
 Dominik Depta
 Bruno Torres
 Papa Ndoye
 Paolo Palmacci
 Heimanu Taiarui

Second yellow cards received  (1)
 Dario Ramacciotti

Red cards received  (1)
 Juan Lopez
 Al Seyni Ndiaye

Sources: FIFA (team), FIFA (player)

Final standings

Broadcasting rights
The following table is a summary of some notable and participating countries' broadcasting licensee holders.

References

External links
FIFA Beach Soccer World Cup Bahamas 2017, FIFA.com
FIFA Beach Soccer World Cup Bahamas 2017  at Beachsoccer.com
FIFA Technical Report

 
2017
International sports competitions hosted by the Bahamas
2017 in beach soccer
2017 in Bahamian sport
Sport in Nassau, Bahamas
April 2017 sports events in North America
May 2017 sports events in North America